Professor Paul William Wellings CBE DL FRSN FRSA FAICD is an Australian/British ecologist and long serving university leader. He is notable for his past service as Vice-Chancellor of University of Wollongong (2012-21), Vice-Chancellor of Lancaster University (2002-12) and Deputy Chief Executive of Australia's Commonwealth Scientific and Industrial Research Organisation (1999-2002). 

Education 

Wellings was born in Nottingham on 1 November 1953 and grew up in India and Nigeria. He was educated at Lancaster Royal Grammar School, King's College London (BSc Joint Hons, Zoology and Botany), Durham University (MSc Advanced Ecology) and the University of East Anglia (UEA) (PhD, 1980). His PhD "Qualitative changes in the regulation of Sycamore aphid numbers" was supervised by Professor Tony Dixon. 

Career 

He was awarded a NERC Personal Fellowship on life-history theory at UEA. In 1981 Wellings resigned his fellowship to take up a position in Australia as a research ecologist at the Commonwealth Scientific and Industrial Research Organisation (CSIRO), specialising in biological control. He was appointed Chief of CSIRO's Entomology Division in 1995. In 1997 he was seconded to the Australian Commonwealth Government Department of Industry, Science and Resources as Head of the Science and Innovation Policy Division and in 1999 returned to CSIRO as Deputy Chief Executive. In 2002 he moved to England to take up the position of Vice-Chancellor at Lancaster University. He held this post until his appointment at the University of Wollongong, NSW. 

He has been of Director of the Australian Nuclear Science and Technology Organisation (ANSTO), the Australian Centre for International Agricultural Research (ACIAR),the Cumbrian Rural Regeneration Company, the Bundanon Trust, University of Wollongong Global Enterprises, the General Sir John Monash Foundation and the Global Foundation. During his academic career he was a board member of Universities UK and chair of UUK's International and European Policy Committee, and a board member of Higher Education Funding Council for England (HEFCE) and Chair of HEFCE's Research Committee, Chair of the 1994 Group of research-intensive universities and, during the COVID-19 pandemic, convener of NSW Vice-Chancellors Committee. 

Honours and Distinctions 

Wellings was appointed Commander of the Order of the British Empire (CBE) in the 2012 Birthday Honours for services to higher education. and Deputy lieutenant of Lancashire (2009). In 2018 Professor Wellings was elected as a Fellow of the Royal Society of New South Wales. He holds honorary degrees from the Universities of Lancaster (2014), Surrey (2019), Wollongong (2021) and East Anglia (2022), and was awarded the 2020 CASE Asia-Pacific Leadership Award.

Portraits of Professor Wellings hang at Lancaster University (Tai-Shan Schierenberg, 2011) and the University of Wollongong (Sally Robinson, 2021). The University of Wollongong's Molecular Sciences building is named in honour of its former Vice-Chancellor.

Personal Life

Paul Wellings is married to linguist and designer, Annette Schmidt. His Great Uncle was the English professional football player, Sam Wynne.

Footnotes

References
Lancaster University VC
HEFCE page on Paul Wellings
Media release on appointment to Lancaster

1953 births
Living people
People educated at Lancaster Royal Grammar School
Alumni of King's College London
Alumni of the University of East Anglia
British ecologists
Commanders of the Order of the British Empire
Deputy Lieutenants of Lancashire
People associated with Lancaster University
Vice Chancellors of the University of Wollongong
Alumni of Durham University Graduate Society